The Sayre Street School building is located at 506 Sayre Street, in an older residential neighborhood near downtown Montgomery, Alabama.  The school was originally built in 1891 by builder J. B. Worthington and today serves as office space.  On February 19, 1982 the building was added to the U.S. National Register of Historic Places.

References

National Register of Historic Places in Montgomery, Alabama
Buildings and structures in Montgomery, Alabama
Romanesque Revival architecture in Alabama
School buildings on the National Register of Historic Places in Alabama